Mark Coles (born 1968/1969) is a New Zealand cricket coach and former player, who is the current head coach of the Pakistan women's national cricket team, his second tenure with the team. From 2021 to 2022, he was the head coach of the Scotland women's national cricket team, and as a player, he made six List A appearances for Wellington.

Playing career
Coles played cricket for Wellington College First XI, and between 1992 and 1996, he made six List A appearances for Wellington. He retired from cricket in 1996  due to a back injury.

Coaching career
In 2000, Coles worked as a coach for the New Zealand women's "A" team. He then worked as a coach for Wellington College, and Sunshine Coast in Queensland, Australia. From 2010 until 2012, Coles was the head coach of the Vanuatu women's national cricket team. He has also been a coach at Waikato Valley, Western Fury, and Wellington Blaze. Whilst head coach of Wellington Blaze, they won the 2012–13 New Zealand Women's Twenty20 Competition. He also worked as a coach for Northern Districts from 2014 to 2017.

In 2017, Coles was appointed head coach of the Pakistan women's national cricket team, initially on a trial basis. He was not initially paid for his work, and had to pay for his own flights to Lahore. Coles was the team's first non-Pakistani coach. After Pakistan won a match against New Zealand, he was given a two-year contract, on the proviso that he lived in Pakistan. He lived in Lahore in a compound with iron gates and snipers on the roof. Whilst he was head coach, Pakistan won nine of the 28 Women's One Day Internationals that they played, and 12 of their 30 Women's Twenty20 International matches, and also finished fifth in the 2017–20 ICC Women's Championship.

In 2019, Coles left his role with Pakistan women for family reasons; two members of his close family had died earlier in the year. He had had a contract until the end of the 2020 ICC Women's T20 World Cup. Coles was replaced as Pakistan women's head coach by Iqbal Imam, who served as an interim coach for the side. In 2020, Coles was a coach for the Japan Cricket Association.

In 2021, Coles became head coach of the Scotland women's national cricket team. He was Scotland women's first full time coach. Under his leadership, Scotland won the 2021 ICC Women's T20 World Cup Europe Qualifier, which enabled them to qualify for the 2022 ICC Women's T20 World Cup Qualifier, and failed to qualify for the 2022 Commonwealth Games. In January 2022, Coles announced his resignation as Scotland head coach, effective from 26 February, as he wanted to move back to New Zealand. He was appointed interim coach of Papua New Guinea in 2022 following the resignation of Carl Sandri.

In January 2023, Coles was re-appointed as the head coach of Pakistan women, on a one-year contract.

Personal life
Coles is from New Zealand, and attended Wellington College. His father Mike played for Wellington in the 1970s. He is married to Mel Humphreys, and they have two children. During the mid-1990s he worked briefly in radio, primarily in sports reporting. In 2020, Coles spoke about how he had suffered from alcoholism and depression, and had previously contemplated suicide.

References

New Zealand cricket coaches
Living people
1960s births
Pakistan women's national cricket team
Cricketers from Wellington City
Wellington cricketers
Scotland women's national cricket team
New Zealand expatriate sportspeople in Scotland
New Zealand expatriate sportspeople in Pakistan
New Zealand expatriate sportspeople in Vanuatu
Coaches of the Papua New Guinea national cricket team
New Zealand expatriate sportspeople in Papua New Guinea